is a 2007 Japanese film directed by Joji Matsuoka. The film is adapted from the best selling autobiography of Lily Franky, a Japanese novelist, actor, illustrator, designer, musician and photographer. The young Eiko is played by Yayako Uchida, the daughter of actress Kirin Kiki who plays Eiko as an old woman. The film was chosen as the Best Film of 2008 at the Japan Academy Prize ceremony.

Plot
A young man who has inherited the irresponsible character of his father must care for his cancer-stricken mother when she moves in with him in Tokyo. Her wise and responsible nature causes him to reorganize his life.

Cast
 Jō Odagiri: Masaya
 Kirin Kiki: Eiko
 Yayako Uchida: Eiko - young
 Takako Matsu: Mizue
 Seiji Rokkaku: Editor-in-chief
 Kaoru Kobayashi: Oton

Others include : Akira Emoto, Itsuji Itao, Ayumi Ito, Ryo Katsuji, Kyōko Koizumi, Hitomi Kurihara, Miyuki Matsuda, Ken Mitsuishi, Aoi Miyazaki, Noriko Sengoku, Tomorowo Taguchi, Rena Takeshita, Tetsushi Tanaka, Susumu Terajima, ...

Reception
The film won five awards at the 2008 Japan Academy Prizes: Best Film, Best Director,  Screenplay of the Year, Best Actress in a Leading Role and Best Actor in a Supporting Role. It also receive nominations for Best Actor in a Leading Role, Best Actress in a Supporting Role and Rookie of the Year. It was also nominated for Best Actor, Best Actress and Best Supporting Actor at the 2nd Asian Film Awards.

Location
Much of the movie's Kokura segments were filmed in Uguisuzawa, Miyagi's Hosokura mine district.

References

External links
 
 
 
 
 
 

2007 films
Films directed by Joji Matsuoka
2000s Japanese-language films
Shochiku films
Picture of the Year Japan Academy Prize winners